Una White (died April 1997) was a Jamaican-British nurse who achieved posthumous notability when her name was placed, in  high illuminated lettering, on Birmingham Central Library (since demolished) for three weeks, as an art installation by Joshua Sofaer part of the city's Fierce! festival. The sign was illuminated from 17 May to 3 June 2007.

Her name was suggested for use in the artwork by her daughter Carol, after a public appeal for people to nominate a friend or family member who deserved to have their name in lights. Una was selected from a number of entries, by a panel comprising advertising mogul Trevor Beattie, broadcaster Mark Lawson, celebrity agent Jonathan Shalit, fashion designer Jemima French, and This Morning presenter Alison Hammond.

Sofaer said the project was "aimed at encouraging people to think about the meaning of celebrity", and that:

Formerly a hairdresser, White moved to the United Kingdom from Jamaica in the 1960s and trained as a nurse before working at St Margaret's (Mental) Hospital in Walsall.

References

External links
 Installation website
 Birmingham City Council page about the installation
 Nomination

2007 works
1997 deaths
Year of birth missing
People from Birmingham, West Midlands
Culture in Birmingham, West Midlands
Jamaican emigrants to the United Kingdom
British nurses
Hairdressers